Edna Andrews is an American scholar and the Nancy & Jeffrey Marcus Distinguished Professor of Slavic & Eurasian Studies at Duke University and holds an honorary doctorate by St. Petersburg State University. Her current concerns are second language education.

Early life and education
Andrews received a doctorate degree from Indiana University Bloomington.

Books
Conversations with Lotman: Cultural Semiotics in Language, Literature, and Cognition (2003).

References

Year of birth missing (living people)
Living people
Duke University faculty
Indiana University Bloomington alumni
Linguists from the United States